Niño del Mar Coching Volante (born January 25, 1978), better known as Nyoy Volante, is a Filipino acoustic pop singer-songwriter and actor.

Early life and education
Volante was born on January 25, 1978, to parents Oliver Volante and Evangeline Coching Volante. He had a sister nicknamed Nyay.

He obtained his technical theater degree from De La Salle-College of St. Benilde. After graduation, he worked with prominent performance groups like Gantimpala Theater and Filipino theater actress Monique Wilson’s New Voice Company. He worked in lights, sound and production design, occasionally stumbling upon small directorial gigs.

Career
Volante started his career at the early 2000s. His famous songs are Nasaan Ka Na, Wansapanataym and Someday.

In 2015, he was one of the eight contestants of the first season of Your Face Sounds Familiar.

In 2015, he made his acting debut on ABS-CBN on the TV series Ningning.

He played Lola, the title character in Atlantis Productions Kinky Boots in 2018 and 2019 in Carlos P. Romulo Auditorium, Makati.

Since the 2nd Kids Season, he has been the choreography mentor of Your Face Sounds Familiar.

Filmography

Television

Protege (GMA 7)
P.O.5 (The 5 Network) - guest performer
StarStruck (GMA 7)
Pinoy Dream Academy (ABS-CBN 2) - guest judge & teacher 
Wowowee (ABS-CBN 2) - guest performer 
Maynila (GMA 7) - guest performer
Eat Bulaga (GMA 7) - guest performer
SOP (GMA 7) - guest performer 
Magandang Tanghali Bayan (ABS-CBN 2) - guest performer

Digital
 Spirits: Reawaken as Maestro Jose Carpio (iWant, 2018)
 Lyric and Beat as Wolfgang Aragon (iWantTFC, 2022)

Movies

Discography

Studio albums

Singles

Personal life
Volante had a relationship with fellow Filipino singer Nina but their relationship ended in 2007. In 2009, she sued Volante's parents allegedly with estafa case after they failed to settle their 1.4-million peso debt.

On February 24, 2016, he got married with Filipino theater actress Mikkie Bradshaw at the Manila Cathedral, Intramuros, Manila, Philippines. He is a stepfather to his wife's daughter Sofie.

References

External links

Living people
1978 births
Filipino pop singers
Vicor Music artists